The Samsung Galaxy J1 mini prime (also known as Galaxy V2) is an Android powered smartphone developed by Samsung Electronics and was released in December 2016. It is the successor of the J1 Nxt/mini.

Specifications

Hardware 
The Samsung J1 mini prime is powered by a Spreadtrum SC9830 SoC including a quad-core ARM Cortex-A7 CPU with either 1.2 GHz (3G) or 1.5 GHz (LTE), an ARM Mali-400MP2 GPU and 1GB of RAM. The 8GB of internal storage can be expanded for up to 128 GB via microSD card. It also features a 5 MP rear camera with LED flashlight and a video resolution of 480p at 30fps.

Software 
The J1 mini prime is originally shipped with Android 5.1.1 "Lollipop" and Samsung's TouchWiz user interface. LTE-models are shipped with Android 6.0.1 "Marshmallow".

See also 
 Samsung Galaxy
 Samsung Galaxy J series

References 

Samsung Galaxy
Mobile phones introduced in 2016
Android (operating system) devices
Samsung mobile phones
Mobile phones with user-replaceable battery